The De la Vaulx Medal is an aviation award presented by the Fédération Aéronautique Internationale (FAI), the international aviation standard setting and record-keeping body. The award was established in 1933 in memory of the Comte de La Vaulx, who was a founder and president of the FAI.

The De la Vaulx Medal is awarded to holders of recognized absolute world aviation records set during the year before.

Recipients
The following is an incomplete list of recipients of the De la Vaulx Medal:

1934 - Francesco Agello, Regia Aeronautica Italiana
1935 - Francesco Agello, Regia Aeronautica Italiana
1937 - Mikhail Gromov, Andrey Yumashev and Sergey Danilin, non-stop flight distance record of 10,148 kilometers (6,306 mi) from Moscow, Russia, to San Jacinto, California, US, via the North Pole 
1938 - Ronald Gustave Kellet, Royal Air Force Pilot
1951 - Fred Ascani, 100-kilometer closed course speed record of 635 mph in an F-86E
1986 - Dick Rutan and Jeana Yeager, around-the-world flight of the Rutan Voyager
2016 - Alberto Porto, Aircraft engineer & pilot, world speed record of the class R in a Risen (airplane)

See also

 List of aviation awards

References

FAI awards webpage

Aviation awards